Flori Lang (born 30 January 1983) is a Swiss sprinter swimmer who won three medals at the European Championships of 2003, 2008 and 2011. He also competed in two freestyle events at the 2008 Summer Olympics, but did not reach the finals. By 2011 he won 37 national titles. 

In April 2012, he starting training in finswimming and just a few months later 
set a world record and won a European gold medal in 50 m with bifins.

Lang has a sister, Sandra. He holds a degree of Bachelor of Arts in Banking & Finance from the University of Zurich.

References

External links
Personal website
Personal bests. swimrankings.net

1983 births
Living people
Swiss male freestyle swimmers
Swimmers at the 2008 Summer Olympics
Olympic swimmers of Switzerland
European Aquatics Championships medalists in swimming
Sportspeople from Zürich
Finswimmers
Swiss male backstroke swimmers
21st-century Swiss people